Shuchi Grover is an American learning scientist and computer science education researcher. Her research investigates computational thinking and how to design effective educational courses for children.

Early life and education 
Grover was an undergraduate student at Harvard University, where she studied physics and computer science. She earned a master's degree in computer sciences at Harvard, and developed software for music students. As part of this project, she used digital repositories to store score sheets. It was her first introduction to the potential of technology to accelerate student learning. She completed a degree in Technology, Innovation and Education at Harvard, before moving to California. Grover focused on learning sciences at Stanford University for her doctoral research, which investigated advanced computational thinking for deep learning in middle school students and was supervised by Roy Pea. She developed a 6-week Stanford OpenEdX course to introduce middle school students to computer sciences.

Research and career 
In 2010, Grover was awarded an Amir Lopatin Fellowship to study computational thinking in K-12 students. She is particularly interested in how computational learning could be a social driver. As part of the fellowship, Grover studied middle school students in Bangalore. Her research investigated the various dimensions of computational thinking and how children choose what to value and engage with. In 2014, she argued that to increase the number of women in technology, computer science should be taught in US schools, and computer scientists should act to diminish the "nerd" stereotype.

Selected publications

References 

Harvard College alumni
Stanford University alumni
American women scientists
Living people
Year of birth missing (living people)